Tomodon is a monotypic genus of colubrid snakes,which includes the species Tomodon dorsalis, and is endemic to South America.

References

Colubrids

Snake genera